Disney Junior, officially as Disney Junior Central and Eastern Europe, Middle East and Africa (CEMA) is a European-managed pay television preschool channel focused on younger viewers, aged 2–7 years old. It was launched on 1 June 2011 replacing Playhouse Disney. It is owned and operated by The Walt Disney Company Limited, an international division of The Walt Disney Company in London, and broadcasts in 7 languages.

it is available through Bulgaria, Greece, Cyprus, Poland, Romania, Turkey with the Middle East (except, Iran, Israel, and Syria), most of Africa, and the Balkan countries (except Albania).

Disney Junior is partially available in the Czech Republic through some satellite services, but does not air through its native language (Czech), unlike the former block on Disney Channel. It was previously available in Hungary between 2015 to 2017 in an Hungarian language track. Since May 2016, it added an Arabic language counterpart for the MENA transmission via OSN. Since April 2022, Disney Junior is currently the only Disney-branded TV channel in Turkey since Disney Channel closed.

Disney Junior programs are currently available on Disney+ which launched in South Africa on 18 May 2022, the Middle East and North Africa on 8 June; and Greece, Turkey, and CEE on 14 June, concluding Europe's release.

See also 

 Disney Channel (Europe, Middle East and Africa)
 Disney Junior

Notes

References

External links
 Disney Junior Africa schedule
 Disney Junior Greece schedule
 Disney Junior MENA (Arabic) schedule
 Disney Junior MENA (English) schedule
 Disney Junior Poland schedule
 Disney Junior Romania schedule

Television channels and stations established in 2011
The Walt Disney Company
Southern Africa
Television channel articles with incorrect naming style
Television stations in Africa
Television channels in Greece
Television stations in Bosnia and Herzegovina
Television stations in the United Arab Emirates
Television stations in Algeria
Television channels in Cyprus
Television stations in Lebanon
Television channels in Slovenia
Television stations in Serbia
Television stations in Kuwait
Television channels in Croatia
Television stations in Montenegro
Television stations in Tunisia
Television channels in Jordan
Television stations in Egypt
Television stations in Morocco
Television stations in Libya
Children's television channels in Croatia
Children's television channels in North Macedonia
Television stations in Saudi Arabia
Television stations in the State of Palestine
Television stations in South Africa
Television stations in Kosovo
Television stations in Iraq
Television channels in Bulgaria
Television stations in Turkey
Children's television channels in Turkey
Defunct television channels in Hungary